A constitutional referendum was held in Ivory Coast on 30 October 2016. Voters were asked whether they approve of a proposed new constitution. The new constitution would create a Senate, remove the nationality clause from the presidential requirements and establish the post of Vice-President. The constitution was approved by 93.42% of votes with a 42.42% turnout, as announced by the president of the Independent Electoral Commission (CEI).

Background 
The holding of the referendum was approved by the National Assembly on 22 July 2016 by a vote of 233 to 6 with seven abstentions.

New constitution

The new constitution includes several changes to the current constitution, including the removal of a requirement for both parents of presidential candidates to be natural-born Ivorians and not to have had any other citizenship. It would also create the post of Vice-President and a Senate composed of former public servants. The President, Vice-President and two thirds of the Senate is to be elected at the same time as parliamentary elections, with the remaining third appointed by the president-elect.

There is speculation that President Alassane Ouattara may seek a third term in 2020 if the clauses in the current constitution that requires presidential candidates to be younger than 75 is scrapped. However, he has continued to promise that he would retire from politics in 2020 after two five-year terms (2010–2015 and 2015–2020).

Campaign
Campaigning for the referendum was held between 22 and 29 October. The proposed constitution was supported by the Rally of Houphouëtists for Democracy and Peace, an alliance composed of the Rally of the Republicans, the Democratic Party of Côte d'Ivoire, the Union for Democracy and Peace in Côte d'Ivoire, the Movement of the Forces of the Future and the Union for Ivory Coast, and some other parliamentary parties, including the Ivorian Workers' Party. It was opposed by a coalition of 23 parties headed by former president Laurent Gbagbo due to the lack of public consultation during the drafting process.

Conduct
On polling day there was violence in pockets of Abidjan, where youth groups mainly from the opposition ransacked schools and several polling stations. The youth groups have been reported as being opposition members, who prevented people from voting in opposition strong holds. The interior minister Hamed Bakayoko declared that there was reported violence at over 100 polling stations in the city.

Results

By region

References

External links
Official website 
2016 Turnout map Abidjan.net

2016 in Ivory Coast
2016 referendums
2016
Constitutional referendums
October 2016 events in Africa